In Sufism, the Salat al-Fatih (opener's prayer) is a regular litany (wird) and prayer for Muhammad practiced individually or in congregation by followers (murids) in the Tijaniyya order.

Presentation
Salat al-Fatih is commonly known as Durood Fatih in the Indian subcontinent and Sholawat Fatih in Far East Asia.

This litany was transmitted to Muslims by the Sheikh Muhammad ibn Abi al-Hasan al-Bakri, a descendant of Abu Bakr al-Siddiq.

It is also attributed to Sheikh Ahmad al-Tijani, the founder of the Tijaniyya Sufi order, and this prayer is actually recited by millions of Tijaniyya adherents (murids) across the world as part of their daily wird.

The full text and authentic formula of this litany and prayer for Muhammad is as follows:

Benefits
Many Sufis seniors have related the benefits of regularly reciting Salat al-Fatih.

Several Imams mentioned these benefits in the context of religious sciences and spiritual path.

Among the advantages of this litany, it is cited that whoever murid or salik recites it once in their life will not enter hell.

Some scholars have explained that each recitation of this prayer would amount to 10,000 other prayers for Muhammad, and others put the number 600,000.

The Sufis also say that whoever recites this prayer continuously for 40 days, Allah will accept his repentance (tawbah) for all his sins.

If a murid recites this formula 1000 times on a Thursday, Friday or Monday evening, he will be gratified by his meeting with Muhammad.

Practice
A condition for the good recitation of this prayer and that it must begin beforehand by offering four prayer units (rakates).

The recitation (tilawa) of surah Al-Qadr will be performed in the first rakah, surah Al-Zalzalah in the second, surah Al-Kafirun in the third, and the two surates of seeking refuge (Surah Al-Falaq and Surah Al-Nas) in the fourth.

After having completed the reading of this ritual prayer, the murid must burn a perfume of agarwood incense to perfume the room or the place of the recitation.

Gallery

See also 
 Salawat
 Wazifa
 Lazimi
 Dua
 Dhikr
 Wird
 Tijaniyya

References

External links
 
 
 
 
 

Sufism
Spiritual practice
Language and mysticism
Arabic words and phrases
Islamic belief and doctrine
Islamic terminology